"Dig for Fire" is a song by the American alternative rock band Pixies. The song appeared on their 1990 album Bossanova, and was released as a single in October 1990. The song reached number 11 on the U.S. Modern Rock Tracks chart and number 62 in the UK. According to Pixies frontman Black Francis, the song was "a bad Talking Heads imitation."

The song was promoted with a music video that also featured another Bossanova track, the brief "Allison", a tribute to jazz musician Mose Allison.

The single version of "Dig for Fire" is mixed differently from the album version and also contains some overdubs.

Track listing
All songs written by Black Francis, except where otherwise noted.

"Dig for Fire" – 2:51
"Velvety Instrumental Version" – 2:04
"Winterlong" (Neil Young) – 3:07
"Santo" – 2:16

Charts

References

1990 singles
Pixies (band) songs
Songs written by Black Francis
Elektra Records singles
4AD singles
1990 songs
Song recordings produced by Chris Sheldon
Song recordings produced by Gil Norton